The 1988 Stella Artois Championships was a men's tennis tournament played on grass courts at the Queen's Club in London in the United Kingdom that was part of the 1988 Nabisco Grand Prix circuit. It was the 86th edition of the tournament, running from 6 June until 13 June 1988. Fourth-seeded Boris Becker won the singles title.

Finals

Singles

 'Boris Becker defeated  Stefan Edberg 6–1, 3–6, 6–3
 It was Becker's 5th title of the year and the 23rd of his career.

Doubles

 Ken Flach /  Robert Seguso defeated  Pieter Aldrich /  Danie Visser 6–2, 7–6
 It was Flach's 1st title of the year and the 20th of his career. It was Seguso's 1st title of the year and the 20th of his career.

References

External links
 Official website
 ATP tournament profile

 
Stella Artois Championships
Queen's Club Championships
Stella Artois Championships
Stella Artois Championships
Stella Artois Championships